The men's finweight (−54 kilograms) event at the 2010 Asian Games took place on 20 November 2010 at Guangdong Gymnasium, Guangzhou, China.

Schedule
All times are China Standard Time (UTC+08:00)

Results 
Legend
W — Won by withdrawal

Final

Top half

Bottom half

References

Results

External links
Official website

Taekwondo at the 2010 Asian Games